Yeh Un Dinon Ki Baat Hai is an Indian Hindi language coming of age romantic period drama television series produced by Shashi Sumeet Productions which was aired on Sony TV. It stars Ashi Singh and Randeep Rai as Naina Agarwal and Sameer Maheshwari. Set in the 1990s and based on youngster's love story, it is inspired by the real-life love story of producers Shashi and Sumeet Mittal. It received a highly positive response from the critics and audience after its premiere and runtime.

The show has received critical acclaim with praise for its performances and script.

In July 2019, it was announced that the show would go off air and the last episode was aired on 16 August 2019. However, Sony TV announced that the show will return with a second season at an indefinite date.

Plot
The narration starts the story in Ahmedabad, in the year 1990. Naina Agarwal is a 16-year old girl studying at Pragati Vidya Ka Mandir. She lost her mother at birth, is raised by her Chacha-Chachi, lives in a conservative joint family. Her father Rakesh Agarwal, a librarian at Pragati Vidya Ka Mandir, have an orthodox mindset supporting only his son Arjun's dream and neglecting Naina. But Naina is supported by her uncle Anand and aunt Bela. And in Nainital, Sameer Maheshwari, a 17-year-old, gets suspended from his boarding school on account of mischief. He returns to his maternal grandfather, Jaiprakash Maheshwari, in Ahmedabad. After Sameer's father died, his mother Vishakha had married Vivek Somani and shifted to Delhi. Their relationship has got only bitter with time.  In turn of events, Sameer joins his cousin Munna's school, which is also Naina's school, as her classmate; she falls for him at the first sight.

Sameer formed a disliking against Naina when she, as the Head Discipline Monitor of her school, had to testify against him. On the other hand, Naina admires and dreams of her first love, Sameer, all the time. Sameer decides to take part in the Headboy competition to prove himself worthy to his mother. He asks for Naina's help and Naina readily starts teaching him. But Rakesh caught and rebuked her as the opponent against Sameer was her own brother Arjun Agarwal. Sameer again gets angry on Naina as she kept silent in front of her father. Later, Arjun wins the competition whereas Sameer is appreciated by Vishakha for his hardwork and dedication which does not sit well with Vivek Somani. But the situation gets worse when Naina misunderstands and accuses him of stealing the exam papers in front of the Principal. His restrained relationship with his mother is highly affected, along his reputation in school. Thus an enraged Sameer decides to take revenge on both Rakesh and Naina, engaging in a bet with his seniors, where he has to make Naina say "I Love You" and hug him. Sameer and his friends Munna and Pandit start acting on the bet as he keeps trying to woo Naina. Naina gets to know it's Arjun who had stolen the question paper, and she starts responding to his efforts.

After Naina refuses to tie Sameer a Rakhi on Raksha Bandhan, they start pursuing a relationship. Naina's penfriend-turned-neighbour Shefali keeps helping her with situations. Throughout the time, Sameer develops a soft corner for Naina but is totally unaware of it. Naina's best friend Swati, who also have a crush on Sameer, gets to know about their secret relationship and gets upset. But their friendship gets saved with Sameer's efforts.  Sameer wishes to make Naina come to the school trip in Mount Abu and finish the bet there. But as they keep getting to know each other better, he starts falling for her and keeps feeling guilty of the bet. By the end of the trip an overwhelmed Sameer tries hard to back off from the bet, but Naina confesses her feelings first and immediately gets to know the truth. She gets heartbroken.

Naina has a hard time dealing with the pain, still decides to move on for her family and herself. On the other hand, Sameer had decided to stay away from her till his friends Munna and Pandit made his realise he had to apologize to her. But at school, Naina pretends like nothing happened and keeps avoiding Sameer's attempts at apology. Sameer falls sick after spending the whole night in front of Naina's house. Naina visits him in the hospital and has a breakdown after telling him why she can't forgive him easily. Sameer finally realizes he is in love with Naina.

Sameer tells his grandfather everything who scolds him for his deeds but promises to help him. Arjun overhears the seniors in the school and gets to know about the bet. His raging confrontation with Sameer results in a scuffle, where Sameer tries to resist him but accidentally pushes him down the stairs, breaking his leg. As a punishment, Sameer is asked to serve Arjun at his home till his recovery. Sameer faces a lot of difficulty in Naina's home. He melts Naina's heart by getting Rakesh in the PTA meeting where she was awarded. After Naina's cousin Pooja's marriage wedding festivities begin at home, he accidentally mistakes Preeti (Naina's cousin) as Naina and confesses his love. Preeti first gets angry at Naina for not sharing this ever with her, but after hearing both sides she too supports Sameer. Over the time of the wedding, Sameer manages to win everyone's heart. Naina too finally forgives Sameer after realizing all his efforts. Sameer and Naina 
both confess their love to each other after Sameer helps Arjun win a crucial cricket match of his career.

Jaiprakash Maheshwari passes away and Sameer has to shift to Delhi without Naina or any of his friends knowing. There Sameer reconciles with his mother and also bonds with his step-siblings Deepika and Rohan. Meanwhile, Sameer and Naina carry on their long distance relationship by communicating through phones and letters with the former's neighbour Amrita's help. However, the consequences of their relationship leads to Naina failing in exam whereas Sameer as a result of loneliness in Delhi falls into bad company. Shanti, Naina's class teacher finds out about her relationship with Sameer and warns her not to compromise her studies. Naina promises Sameer that she will study hard and top again and eventually does. She manages to send  Munna and Pandit to Delhi where they realise of Sameer's bad company and make him realise his mistake. Everything goes on smoothly and Sameer joins a radio station as a programmer where Naina listens to his voice everyday. But due to Mr. Somani's mother's harsh words Sameer starts considering himself as unlucky for his loved ones. He tries to disconnect from Naina through all means, but is sent back to Ahmedabad by his mother after she notices his depression. Meanwhile, Naina celebrates farewell in her school where she feels Sameer's presence.

Anand wants Naina to take admission in a reputed University but when she realises that Sameer considers himself unlucky for her and that he is joining VJN College, she somehow manages to take admission there and makes Sameer realise that his assumptions about himself are wrong.In the meantime, Swati also gets into relationship with Munna. Their happy days come to a halt when Naina breaks up with Sameer after seeing the consequences of Arjun-Shefali's relationship in her family. Soon her marriage is fixed to an arrogant CA Sharad. Sameer, in order to make Naina jealous, gets in a relationship with their classmate Sunaina which angers Naina and she warns him against this. Soon Sameer and Naina decide to be friends to preserve the happy memories of their love. But destiny plays its game and Naina breaks the alliance because of Sharad's violent behavior towards her uncle, Anand. Anand gets to know about Sameer and Naina's relationship and he approves after realising Sameer's true love for Naina. He promises to stand by them during their marriage. Hence, Sameer breaks up with Sunaina who decides for revenge.

Sameer and Naina get back to pursuing their relationship in college. Sunaina challenges Naina to contest for General Secretary elections against her. Naina, Sameer and their friends unknowingly hurts Swati who was a candidate for election and cancels her nomination without asking her. Sunaina takes advantage of this and manipulates a heart broken Swati against Naina. Swati promises to help her. Sameer gets suspicious of Swati's intentions and tries to warn Naina but she refuses to believe. Finally, Naina wins the elections but loses her childhood friend as Swati is exposed in front of them. Meanwhile, Sunaina and her gang leave no stone unturned to insult Naina and Sameer but eventually falls in their own trap.

After some time, they get caught red-handed as a couple and hell breaks loose. Everyone in the family gets furious on Naina. Rakesh tries to forcefully marry Naina to Sharad. Since Anand was out of town, it became difficult for Naina to convince her father. Meanwhile, Sameer plans to elope with Naina and hide somewhere until Anand's arrival. He succeeds with his friends help. Swati too joins in helping Naina and Sameer and the gang have a reunion. On the other hand, Anand arrives and misunderstood the situation and gets angry on Naina and Sameer but Bela tells him the truth.

At Sameer's family,Vishakha had already disapproved of Naina for Sameer assuming she's too practical unlike him. But after Sameer's blackmailing, the family had to come forward to agree to their marriage. After an ugly situation in the engagement, Sameer moves out of his house to marry Naina on his own, the Agarwal family too gets broken as Naresh and Beena disapproves of the alliance despite Anand and Bela's constant requests. In the name of Arjun's future, Naresh forces Rajesh to not attend Naina's wedding. But with the help of the friends and the remaining family, the couple finally gets married with everyone's blessings.

Sameer and Naina start living in a separate bungalow Sameer especially bought for her. But reality hits when the differences in their living and mindsets started creating clashes between them. Due to their young age and immaturity, their marriage starts on a rocky road since both end up making several mistakes. Sameer's uncle, Kamlesh and his son, Devang kick him out from the family business too. But after a big fight, Sameer and Naina decide to work on themselves and make their love last despite everything.

Sameer and Naina start their own business, called 'Samaina boutique' which doesn't run very well. But Sameer gets to act in an advertisement, where he realizes his acting potential. They decide to travel to Mumbai for an acting career. They sell their house and left for Mumbai with Rakesh. But it wasn't as easy as they thought it would be. They struggle to settle in the city. Eventually Naina decides to take her passion for writing as a career, and Sameer decides to support his wife with writing. They present their first story to Aruna Irani. She accepts their story and telecasts their serial which is successful. Soon they are able to buy their rented flat in Mumbai.

Naina gives birth to their daughter, named Suman Maheshwari. After 2 years, Sameer buys back his old bungalow in Ahmedabad for Naina. They return to Ahmedabad and reconcile with the family members, even those who had turned foes during their marriage. Naina, Sameer, and all their friends reunite at their school's 50th anniversary. They reminiscence their old days. Thus the story concludes happily in 1998.

Cast

Main
Ashi Singh as Naina Agarwal Maheshwari – Rakesh and Rama's daughter; Arjun's sister; Pooja, Preeti and Pralay's cousin; Sameer's wife; Suman's mother. (2017–19)
Randeep Rai as Sameer Maheshwari – Vishakha's son; Vivek's step-son; Deepika's half-brother; Rohan's step-brother; Naina's husband; Suman's father. (2017–19)

Recurring
 Ayesha Kaduskar as Preeti Agarwal – Anand and Bela's younger daughter; Pooja's sister; Arjun, Naina and Pralay's cousin; Shubham's wife (2017–19)
 Sanjay Choudhary as Manoj "Munna" Dhawan – Sameer's cousin and Pandit's friend; Swati's ex-fiancé; Rewa's husband (2017–19)
 Raghav Dhir as Pushpendra "Pandit" Kapoor – Sameer and Munna's friend (2017–19)
 Chandresh Singh as Rakesh Agarwal – Naresh and Anand's brother; Rama's widower; Naina and Arjun's father; Suman's grandfather (2017–19)
 Sachin Khurana as Anand Agarwal – Rakesh and Naresh's brother; Bela's husband; Pooja and Preeti's father (2017–19)
 Madhusree Sharma as Bela Agarwal – Anand's wife; Preeti and Pooja's mother (2017–19)
 Abha Parmar as Beena Agarwal – Juhi's aunt; Naresh's wife; Pralay's mother (2017–19)
 Sanjay Batra as Naresh Agarwal – Rakesh and Anand's brother; Beena's husband; Pralay's father (2017–19)
 Kristina Patel as Swati Srivastava – Naina's best friend; Munna's ex-fiancée (2017–19)
 Kiara Bhanushali as Suman Maheshwari – Sameer and Naina's daughter (2019)
 Somendra Solanki / Vivaan Singh Rajput as Arjun Agarwal – Rakesh and Rama's son; Naina's brother; Pooja, Preeti and Pralay's cousin; Shefali's ex-love interest; Juhi's husband (2017–19)
 Hema Sood as Shefali Victor – Naina's pen friend; Arjun's ex-love interest (2017–18)
 Nidhi Bhavsar as Juhi Agarwal – Beena's niece; Arjun's wife (2018–19)
 Aditya as Prateek "Pralay" Agarwal – Naresh and Beena's son; Arjun, Pooja, Naina and Preeti's cousin (2017–18)
 Malina Kumra as Kamya – Naina's former nemesis turned friend (2017–19)
 Hema Sai as Hema – Naina's former nemesis turned friend (2017–19)
 Shweta Rajput as Pooja Agarwal Mittal – Anand and Bela's elder daughter; Preeti's sister; Varun's wife (2017–19)
 Love Joshi as Varun Mittal – Neeli's brother; Pooja's husband (2017–18)
 Kiran Kumar as Jaiprakash Maheshwari – Vishaka's father; Sameer and Deepika's grandfather (Dead) (2017–18)
 Vaishnavi Mahant as Vishakha Maheshwari Somani – Jaiprakash's daughter; Vivek's wife; Sameer and Deepika's mother; Rohan's step-mother; Suman's grandmother (2017–19)
 Jayshree T. as Phulla Bua – Arjun, Pooja, Naina, Preeti and Pralay's grand-aunt (2018–19)
 Ahsaan Qureshi as U.P Pandey – Principal of Pragati Vidya Ka Mandir (2017–18)
 Rishina Kandhari as Ms. Shanti – Maths teacher of Pragati Vidya Ka Mandir, Naina,Hema,Kamya,Munna Pandit,Swati, and Sameer's class teacher (2017–18)
 Melanie Nazareth as Prabha Maheshwari – Kamlesh's wife; Devang's mother; Sameer's aunt (2018–19)
 Rajendra Chawla as Kamlesh Maheshwari – Vishaka's cousin; Prabha's husband; Devang's father; Sameer's uncle (2018–19)
 Atul Verma as Devang Maheshwari – Kamlesh and Prabha's son; Sameer's cousin; Poonam's husband (2018–19)
 Subuhi Joshi as Poonam Maheshwari - Devang's wife, Sameer's sister-in-law (2018–19)
 Kanchan Gupta as Nirmala – Shubham and Tanvi's mother, Preeti's mother in law (2019)
 Ruchita Vijay Jadhav as Vanita – Jatin's wife; Sameer and Naina's neighbour and Society secretary (2019)
 Devang Taana as Jatin – Shibhani's brother; Vanita's husband; Naina and Sameer's neighbour (2019)
 Urvi Vyas as Shibhani – Jatin's sister (2019)
 Nishi Singh as Sunaina Parekh – Naina and Sameer's nemesis at college (2018)
 Hitesh Sharma as Kartik Dholakia – Sameer and Naina's nemesis at college (2018)
 Vikas Tripathi as Shubham – Nirmala's son; Tanvi's brother; Preeti's husband (2019)
 Meghan Jadhav as Aditya Gadkari – Gauri and Gopal's son; Sameer's brotherly friend; Tanvi's husband (2019)
 Tarjanee Bhadla as Tanvi Gadkari – Nirmala's daughter; Shubham's sister; Aditya's wife (2019)
 Manoj Kolhatkar as Gopal Gadkari – Naina and Sameer's neighbor; Gauri's husband; Aditya's father (2019)
 Anuradha as Gauri Gadkari – Gopal's wife; Aditya's mother (2019)
 Sheetal Maulik as Sejal Gadkari – Aditya's sister-in-law (2019)
 Sandeep Rajora as Vivek Somani – Vishaka's husband; Rohan and Deepika's father; Sameer's step-father (2017–19)
 Kitu Gidwani as Mrs. Somani – Vivek's mother; Rohan and Deepika's grandmother (2018)
 Rohit Chandel as Rohan Somani – Vivek's son from his first wife; Vishaka's step-son; Deepika's half-brother; Sameer's step-brother (2018)
 Riddhima Taneja as Deepika Somani – Vivek and Vishaka's daughter; Sameer and Rohan's half-sister (2018)
 Manika Mehrotra as Rinki – Naina and Preeti's cousin (2018–19)
 Prachi Joshi as Rewa – Munna's wife (2019)
 Rushad Rana as Lochan Sir – Ex-drama teacher turned principal in Pragati Vidya Ka Mandir (2017–19)
 Guddi Maruti as VJN college Principal (2018)
 Rashika Singh as Neeli Madhumakkhi – Varun's sister (2018)
 Devarshi Shah as Raghav aka Ameer Maheshwari – Naina's fake husband (2019)
 Vishnu Sharma as Jayesh Bhoummik Raval aka JBR – Accounts teacher of VJN college (2018)
 Arjun Aneja as Farhan Poonawala – Teacher appointed for college play rehearsals, Preeti's crush(2018)
 Vikram Singh Rathod as Sanjay Tibriwal – Naina admirer and classmate at school (2017)
 Nirbhay Shukla as Vicky – Kartik's friend; Naina and Sameer's senior (2018)
 Vaibhav Shrivastav as Priyank – Kartik's friend; Naina's rival (2018)
 Sejal Sharma as Dimple – Vicky's classmate and Sameer's admirer (2018)
 Charu Trikha as Mitali – Rival gang's member at college ; Pandit's former crush(2018)
 Garima Joshi as Sahiba – Sameer and Naina's neighbor (2019)
 Paras Priyadarshan as Sharad – Naina's proposed groom (2018)
 Simran Lulla as Amrita Khanna - Sameer's neighbour and friend in Delhi

Guests
 Kumar Sanu (2018)
 Anant Mahadevan
 Aruna Irani (2019)

Voiceover
 Sadiya Siddiqui as Naina's Voiceover
 Jiten Lalwani as Sameer's Voiceover

Soundtrack 
The opening theme of Yeh Un Dinon Ki Baat Hai is composed by Anu Malik. The lyrics are written by Sanjay Chhel, and it comprises the voices of legendary singers Kumar Sanu and Sadhana Sargam. The song has been praised for its melodious lyrics, which refresh the happenings in the 1990s.

Reception
It was particularly hailed for its fresh outlook and for bringing out the nostalgia and the flavours of the 90s. It topped Sony TV shows by gaining a TRP of 1.5 in its first week.

The Times of India hailed it as one of the best TV shows launched in 2017 and praised the performances of newcomers Ashi Singh and Randeep Rai.

The UK's weekly Asian newspaper Eastern Eye praised the creative team of the show for leaving no stone unturned to recreate the city of Ahmedabad from an earlier era, calling it a tribute to the city.

This show has also earned compliments from various television and film actors.

Awards and nominations

See also 

 List of programs broadcast by Sony Entertainment Television

References

External links
 
 Yeh Un Dinon Ki Baat Hai on Sony LIV
 Official website on SET India

2017 Indian television series debuts
Indian drama television series
Sony Entertainment Television original programming
Television shows set in Delhi
Television shows set in Gujarat
Television series set in the 1990s
Shashi Sumeet Productions series